Jupp Arents (16 March 1912 – 24 December 1984) was a German racing cyclist. He won the German National Road Race in 1938.

References

External links

1912 births
1984 deaths
German male cyclists
Cyclists from Cologne
German cycling road race champions
20th-century German people